Calabrella Creek is a stream in the U.S. state of Mississippi. It is a tributary to the Big Black River.

Calabrella is a name derived from the Choctaw language with an uncertain etymology.  A variant spelling is "Cullabrella Creek".

References

Rivers of Mississippi
Rivers of Webster County, Mississippi
Mississippi placenames of Native American origin